Burzyan-Yelga (Böryänyılğa) is a rural locality (a village) in Ishberdinsky Selsoviet, Baymaksky District, Bashkortostan, Russia. The population was 119 as of 2010. There are 2 streets.

Geography 
Burzyan-Yelga is located 72 km southwest of Baymak (the district's administrative centre) by road. Ishberda is the nearest rural locality.

References 

Rural localities in Baymaksky District